The Online School for Girls (OSG) is a US online learning environment built on the traditions of independent schools and girls' schools. It was founded in 2009 by four such schools forming a non-profit consortium.

Consortium schools

The member schools are:
 Atlanta Girls' School, in Atlanta, Georgia
 Ellis School, Pittsburgh, Pennsylvania
 Harpeth Hall School, Nashville, Tennessee
 Holton-Arms School, Bethesda, Maryland
 Hockaday School, Dallas, Texas
 Laurel School, Cleveland, Ohio
 Marlborough School, Los Angeles, California
 Miss Porter's School, Farmington, Connecticut
 School of the Holy Child, Rye, New York
 St. Mary's Episcopal School, Memphis, Tennessee
 St. Paul's School for Girls, Baltimore, Maryland
 Westover School, Middlebury, Connecticut

Those in bold are the founding members.

There are also a larger number of affiliated schools.

References

External links
Official website

Online schools in the United States
Private and independent school organizations in the United States
Non-profit organizations based in Maryland
Companies based in Bethesda, Maryland
Girls' schools in the United States